Melanie Groves (née McKenzie; born 6 October 1979) is a retired Australian international netball player. Groves played five years with the Queensland Firebirds in the Commonwealth Bank Trophy. In the 2007 season, Groves and fellow Queensland player Peta Stephens refused to sign new player contracts with Netball Queensland, preferring their old contracts and representation by the Australian Netball Players' Association. Groves went on to complete the 2007 season, but retired at the end of that year because she was having her first child (Tiggi Groves).

References

1979 births
Living people
Australian netball players
Queensland Firebirds players
Australia international netball players
Commonwealth Bank Trophy players